Novgorodskoye is a rural locality (a selo) in Novoalexandrovskoye Rural Settlement, Suzdalsky District, Vladimir Oblast, Russia. The population was 23 as of 2010. There are 3 streets.

Geography 
Novgorodskoye is located 39 km southwest of Suzdal (the district's administrative centre) by road. Khotenskoye is the nearest rural locality.

References 

Rural localities in Suzdalsky District